Albicidin is an antibiotic and phytotoxic molecule produced by the bacterium Xanthomonas albilineans which infects sugarcane causing leaf scald.

As a phytotoxin, it acts by inhibiting the differentiation of chloroplasts.  It accomplishes this by inhibiting DNA gyrase, and thereby preventing the replication of chloroplast DNA. As such it plays a major role in leaf scald disease.

As a DNA gyrase inhibitor, albicindin also has potential therapeutic use as an antibiotic.  Its antibiotic properties were discovered in the early 1980s, when the molecule was isolated and purified from cultures of Xanthomonas albilineans. However, the precise structure of the molecule was only identified in 2015.  A laboratory synthesis of albicidin has been developed, and research is currently focused on the design and evaluation of synthetic derivatives of albicidin with improved properties.

References

Plant toxins
Antibiotics
Benzamides
Nitriles